Robert Cogniaux (born 29 May 1934) is a Belgian archer. He competed for Belgium at the 1972, 1976 and 1980 Summer Olympics. His highest position there was a fourth place in 1972 in Munich, West Germany.

References 

1934 births
Living people
Olympic archers of Belgium
Belgian male archers
Archers at the 1972 Summer Olympics
Archers at the 1976 Summer Olympics
Archers at the 1980 Summer Olympics
People from Asse
Sportspeople from Flemish Brabant
20th-century Belgian people